Lukinskogo doma invalidov is a rural locality (a settlement) in Golovinskoye Rural Settlement, Sudogodsky District, Vladimir Oblast, Russia. The population was 111 as of 2010.

Geography 
Lukinskogo doma invalidov is located 28 km west of Sudogda (the district's administrative centre) by road. Komary is the nearest rural locality.

References 

Rural localities in Sudogodsky District